Herzliya Light, also known as Herzliya Marina Light is a lighthouse in Herzliya, Israel. It is located at the end of the main breakwater of the Herzliya marina. The lighthouse is accessible by walking the pier, but the tower is closed to the public.

See also

 List of lighthouses in Israel

References

 Listed as "Herzlia Marina, breakwater".

Lighthouses in Israel
Herzliya
Buildings and structures in Tel Aviv District